Kseniya Olehivna Baylo (born 25 February 2005) is a Ukrainian diver.

Career
In 2021, Baylo and Oleksiy Sereda won the gold medal in the mixed 10 m platform synchro event at the 2020 European Aquatics Championships held in Budapest, Hungary. Baylo and Sofiya Lyskun won the bronze medal in the women's 10 m synchro platform event.

In the 2021 FINA World Junior Diving Championships in her home country Ukraine she won gold in the 3m springboard and 10m platform event of her age group B.

References

External links
 

Living people
2005 births
Sportspeople from Mykolaiv
Ukrainian female divers
21st-century Ukrainian women